John "Handsome Johnny" Roselli (born Filippo Sacco; July 4, 1905 – August 7, 1976), sometimes spelled Rosselli, was a mobster for the Chicago Outfit who helped that organization exert influence over Hollywood and the Las Vegas Strip. Roselli was recruited by the Central Intelligence Agency (CIA) in a plot to assassinate Cuban leader Fidel Castro.

Early years 
Roselli was born Filippo Sacco on July 4, 1905, in Esperia, Lazio, Italy. His father, Vincenzo Sacco, had moved to the United States first, followed by Filippo at the age of 6, who had immigrated with his mother, Mariantonia Pascale Sacco to Boston, Massachusetts. His father died in 1918.

1920s 
In 1922, Sacco was arrested on narcotics charges in Massachusetts. He first fled to New York for three months, before moving on to Chicago, where he changed his name from Filippo Sacco to John Roselli.

Roselli moved to Los Angeles in 1924, pleading guilty to bootlegging that same year.  Roselli began his California criminal career working for small-time bootleggers, becoming the top truck driver for Tony Cornero. Eventually, Roselli was promoted to working closely with the Cornero brothers in securing the liquor imports into Southern California. He was especially important in bribing and securing the loyalty of Orange County officials, opening up their ports for the gang's use. In 1926, Tony Cornero fled to Canada, escaping a 2-year bootlegging sentence. As a result of the gang's dissolution, Roselli went independent. He became further involved in several LA area vice rackets, especially prostitution and gambling.

Roselli first met Al Capone in 1927, on a trip to Chicago to attend the Jack Dempsey-Gene Tunney Boxing match. Capone was holding a party that night at his headquarters, Metropole Hotel, where Johnny was able to briefly meet him and the Chicago Outfit's inner circle. Roselli next met with Capone at the Biltmore Hotel in Downtown Los Angeles. In 1928, Capone invited Roselli to Chicago, this time offering him a role in his organization. Roselli was tasked with working with the Los Angeles crime family, to keep an eye on Capone's investments and facilitate cooperation between the LA and Chicago organizations. The LA branch of the mafia was at the time under the leadership of Joseph Ardizzone, and Roselli worked closely with Ardizonne's underboss Jack Dragna.

During this time, Roselli was involved with Los Angeles' offshore gambling racket. He led the mob's hostile takeover of the gambling ship Monfalcone. Roselli's underworld activities sometimes had to be put on hold while he dealt with long bouts of tuberculosis.

Roselli became close friends with film producer Bryan Foy, who brought Roselli into the movie business as a producer with Foy's small production company, Eagle Lion Studios, where Roselli is credited on a number of early gangster movies as a producer. Roselli was also close friends with Columbia Pictures co-founder Harry Cohn.

1930s 
In 1931, LA Mafia boss Joseph Ardizzone survived two assassination attempts and declared he would retire. Instead, he disappeared in October 1931 and Jack Dragna took his place as Don. 

In July 1933, Frank L. Shaw began his term as the Los Angeles mayor. He put in place a heinously corrupt administration where the city's underworld paid regular bribes directly to city hall. Roselli was able to use his position in LA's mafia and deep knowledge of the city's underworld to make himself the liaison between the mayor's office and the various gangs and individuals who sent regular payoffs to city hall. This favored position with the city government helped to position Jack Dragna's organization as the preeminent criminal organization in Los Angeles under the Shaw administration.

1940s-1950s 
  During this period Rosselli's lawyer was Frank DeSimone; secretly a mob member, DeSimone became the L.A. mob boss when Jack Dragna died in 1956.
In 1942, Roselli was indicted on federal labor racketeering charges, along with George Brown, former president of the International Alliance of Theatrical Stage Employees union, and Willie Bioff, labor racketeer and former pimp. Later in 1942, Roselli enlisted in the United States Army where he served for three years before receiving an undesirable discharge. It was while in the service that Roselli was convicted of the extortion scheme to extort money from Hollywood figures, in 1943, serving a prison sentence until his release in 1947.

In the mid-1950s, Roselli shifted his focus away from Hollywood and toward the fast-growing and highly profitable gambling mecca, Las Vegas, Nevada. By 1956, Roselli had become the Chicago and Los Angeles mob's chief representative in Las Vegas. His job was to ensure that the Chicago mob bosses received their share of the burgeoning casino revenues through "skimming". However, according to the Los Angeles office of the FBI, Roselli was employed as a movie producer at Monogram Studios.

1960s 

After the Cuban Revolution in January 1959, Fidel Castro closed down the casinos that the Mob operated in Cuba, and attempted to drive the mobsters out of the country. This made Roselli, Chicago Outfit boss Sam Giancana and Tampa boss Santo Trafficante amenable to the idea of killing Castro.

According to the Family Jewels documents released in 2007, members of the American mafia were involved in CIA's attempts to assassinate Cuban leader Fidel Castro. The documents showed that, in September 1960, the CIA recruited Robert Maheu, an ex-FBI agent and aide to Howard Hughes in Las Vegas, to approach Roselli under the pretense of representing international corporations that wanted Castro dead due to lost gambling interests. Roselli introduced Maheu to mobster leaders Sam Giancana and Santo Trafficante Jr. Supplied with six poison pills from the CIA, Giancana and Trafficante tried unsuccessfully to have people place the poison in Castro's food. Further attempts were canceled soon thereafter due to the Bay of Pigs invasion in April 1961.

In 1963, singer Frank Sinatra sponsored Roselli for membership in the exclusive Los Angeles Friar's Club. Soon after his acceptance, Roselli discovered an elaborate card-cheating operation run by one of his Las Vegas friends, Maurice Friedman, and asked for his cut. The card cheating was finally discovered in July 1967 by FBI agents tailing Roselli. Scores of wealthy men, including millionaire Harry Karl, the husband of actress Debbie Reynolds, and actor Zeppo Marx, were bilked out of millions of dollars. Grant B. Cooper represented some of the defendants in the case, including Roselli. Roselli was eventually convicted and fined $55,000. During the trial, secret grand jury transcripts were discovered on the defense attorney's table. Cooper eventually pleaded guilty to contempt for possessing the documents.

In the 1960s, Immigration and Naturalization Service had also tried to deport Roselli, although were unsuccessful.

1970s 
On June 24 and September 22, 1975, Roselli testified before the 1975 U.S. Senate Select Committee on Intelligence (SSCIA) led by Idaho Senator Frank Church about the CIA plan to kill Castro, Operation Mongoose. Shortly before Roselli testified, an unknown person shot and killed Giancana in the basement of his Illinois home. This happened just days before Giancana was to testify before the committee. Giancana's murder supposedly prompted Roselli to permanently leave Los Angeles and Las Vegas for Miami, Florida.

On April 23, 1976, Roselli was called before the committee to testify about a conspiracy to kill President Kennedy. Three months after his first round of testimony on the Kennedy assassination, the Committee wanted to recall Roselli. However, at this point, he had been missing since July 28. On August 3, Senator Howard Baker, a member of the new SSCIA, requested that the FBI investigate Roselli's disappearance.

Death 
On August 7, 1976, ten days after his disappearance, Roselli's decomposing body was found by a fisherman in a 55-gallon steel fuel drum floating in Dumfoundling Bay near Miami, Florida.
 He died of asphyxiation. Federal investigators suggested he may have been killed by Chicago mobsters for keeping an unfair share of the mob's gambling interests in Las Vegas. At the behest of some members of the United States Senate, United States Attorney General Edward H. Levi instructed the FBI to find out if Roselli's earlier testimony regarding the CIA plot to assassinate Castro may have led to his murder.
The FBI investigation summarized, that Roselli was killed by Frank "The German" Schweihs, Vincent Incerro and 2 other suspects. The contract was sanctioned by Chicago Outfits "consigliere" Anthony Accardo, because "Roselli was coming a public source of embarrassment to La Cosa Nostra".

JFK conspiracy allegations
After Roselli's death, journalists Jack Anderson and Les Whitten published an editorial stating that Roselli had told associates that individuals he had recruited to kill Castro had been turned by the Cuban leader to assassinate President John F. Kennedy.

Bill Bonanno, the son of Cosa Nostra mafia boss Joseph Bonanno, claimed in his 1999 memoir, Bound by Honor: A Mafioso's Story, that he had discussed the assassination of Kennedy with Roselli and implicated him as the primary hitman in a conspiracy instigated by the mob. According to Bonanno, Roselli fired at Kennedy from a storm drain on Elm Street. In 2006, the Discovery Channel aired an hour-long television documentary entitled Conspiracy Files:JFK. Based on information in the book Ultimate Sacrifice by Lamar Waldron, the program asserted that Roselli was responsible for framing Abraham Bolden who was arrested the day before he was to appear before the Warren Commission. In 2010, Playboy magazine published an article by Hillel Levin in which Roselli was also implicated in the assassination by Robert "Tosh" Plumlee and James Files, an inmate within the Illinois Department of Corrections.

Popular culture 
In the CBS television drama Vegas, the character from the Chicago Mob Johnny Rizzo, portrayed by Michael Wiseman, is loosely based on Johnny Roselli, as when Rizzo is introduced. Rizzo is in the Vegas black book and is not allowed to be in any casino. When Sheriff Ralph Lamb catches Rizzo in one, he demands that Rizzo leave. Rizzo, known for his temper, gets into a fight, and is easily subdued by Lamb. This is based on an actual event involving the real Sheriff Lamb and Roselli.

See also 
Assassination attempts on Fidel Castro
John F. Kennedy assassination conspiracy theories
List of solved missing person cases

References

Further reading 
 Charles Rappleye & Ed Becker, All American Mafioso: The Johnny Roselli Story; Barricade Books, Inc.; 1995 
 Steve Tantillo, They called him Johnny Handsome/Life & times of Johnny Roselli (December 2011)

External links 
 
 The CIA Family Jewels – includes several memos on Roselli's involvement in attempts to assassinate Fidel Castro

1905 births
1970s missing person cases
1976 deaths
20th-century American criminals
Chicago Outfit mobsters
Deaths by strangulation in the United States
Formerly missing people
Italian emigrants to the United States
Los Angeles crime family
Missing person cases in Florida
Murdered American gangsters of Italian descent
People associated with the assassination of John F. Kennedy
People from the Province of Frosinone
People murdered by the Chicago Outfit
People murdered in Florida
Male murder victims
1976 murders in the United States
United States Army personnel of World War II